In enzymology, a thiosulfate-dithiol sulfurtransferase is an enzyme that catalyzes the chemical reaction

thiosulfate + dithioerythritol  sulfite + 4,5-cis-dihydroxy-1,2-dithiacyclohexane (i.e. oxidized dithioerythritol) + sulfide

Thus, the two substrates of this enzyme are thiosulfate and dithioerythritol, whereas its 3 products are sulfite, 4,5-cis-dihydroxy-1,2-dithiacyclohexane, and sulfide.

This enzyme belongs to the family of transferases, specifically the sulfurtransferases, which transfer sulfur-containing groups.  The systematic name of this enzyme class is thiosulfate:dithioerythritol sulfurtransferase. Other names in common use include thiosulfate reductase, and TSR.  This enzyme participates in sulfur metabolism.

References

 

EC 2.8.1
Enzymes of unknown structure